Meaghan Sargeant (born 16 March 1994) is an English footballer who plays as a defender for FA Women's Super League club Aston Villa. She had previously played for Bristol City, Birmingham City and Notts County.

Club career
Sargeant progressed through Sheffield United's Centre of Excellence, before joining Arsenal Ladies' Academy. In January 2012, Sargeant signed for Lincoln Ladies.

In March 2014, Sargeant joined Birmingham City. In February 2016, she signed a new contract with Birmingham City.

On 28 May 2019, Sargeant became the first summer signing for Bristol City. She joined the club alongside Charlie Wellings.

On 3 July 2021, Sargeant signed for Aston Villa on a 2-year contract. She was their fifth signing of the summer.

References

External links
 Profile at the Birmingham City Ladies F.C. website 
 
 
 
 

Living people
Footballers from Sheffield
1994 births
English women's footballers
Women's association football defenders
Women's Super League players
Birmingham City W.F.C. players
Aston Villa W.F.C. players